The 2014 New York Cosmos season was the new Cosmos' second season of existence, playing in the new North American Soccer League. Including the previous franchise, it was the sixteenth season of a club entitled New York Cosmos playing professional soccer in the New York metropolitan area.

Club

Roster
As of July 19, 2014.

Competitions

Pre-season and Exhibitions

Pre-season

Exhibitions

NASL Spring Season 

The Spring season will last for 9 games beginning on April 12 and ending on June 8.  The schedule will feature a single round robin format with each team playing every other team in the league a single time.  Half the teams will host 5 home games and play 4 road games whereas the other half of the teams will play 4 home games and 5 road games.  The Cosmos will  play 5 of their games at home. The winner of the Spring season will earn the right to host the Soccer Bowl 2014 Championship game.

Standings

Results

Results by round

Match reports

NASL Fall Season 

The Fall season will last for 18 games beginning on July 12 and ending on November 1.  The schedule will feature a double round robin format with each team playing every other team in the league twice, one at home and one on the road.  The winner of the Fall season will play the winner of the Spring season in the Soccer Bowl 2014 Championship game except if the Spring and Fall Champions are the same team in which case the team with the best overall Spring and Fall record behind that team will be their opponent.

Standings

Results

Results by round

Match reports

The Championship

U.S. Open Cup 

The Cosmos will compete in the 2014 edition of the Open Cup entering in the Third Round of the tournament.  The club has said should they host the Third Round match they will play it at Belson Stadium if they are selected as a host for that round due to Shuart Stadium not being available.

Match reports

Squad statistics

Appearances and goals

|-
|colspan="14"|Players who appeared for the New York Cosmos who are no longer at the club:

|-
|}

Goal scorers

Disciplinary record

Transfers

In

Out

Loan In

Loan Out

References 

New York Cosmos (2010–) seasons
New York Cosmos
Cosmos